National Route 328 is a national highway of Japan connecting the cities of Kagoshima and Izumi in Kagoshima prefecture, with a total length of 64.4 km (40.02 mi).

References

National highways in Japan
Roads in Kagoshima Prefecture